The Embassy of the Republic of Indonesia in Dar es Salaam is the diplomatic mission of the Republic of Indonesia to the Tanzania and concurrently as the representative of Indonesia for Republic of Burundi, and Republic of Rwanda
. 
The current Indonesian ambassador to Tanzania is Ratlan Pardede who was appointed by  President Joko Widodo on 18 May 2017.

See also 

 List of diplomatic missions of Indonesia
 List of diplomatic missions in Tanzania

References 

Indonesia–Tanzania relations
Dar es Salaam
Indonesia